Semmiona squameoguttata is a species of leaf beetle of the Democratic Republic of the Congo, described by Léon Fairmaire in 1885.

References

Eumolpinae
Beetles of the Democratic Republic of the Congo
Beetles described in 1885
Taxa named by Léon Fairmaire
Endemic fauna of the Democratic Republic of the Congo